Diplomesodon is a genus of shrew that contains a single extant species, the piebald shrew (Diplomesodon pulchellum).

Taxonomy
An extinct species named Diplomesodon fossorius is known from the Early Pleistocene of South Africa, very distant from the current Caspian region distribution of the piebald shrew.

Another potential member of this genus is the enigmatic Sonnerat's shrew (Diplomesodon sonnerati) which is known from no physical remains and has been described based solely on a 19th century manuscript. Its status as a valid taxon is contentious, and even if it is indeed valid, the lack of any physical material indicates that it most likely has gone extinct.

References

Shrews
Mammal genera
Mammal genera with one living species